Dexter Darden is an American actor, best known for playing the role of Walter Hill in Joyful Noise, and Frypan in the Maze Runner film series.

Personal life 
Dexter was engaged to singer/actress JoJo, they  split in November 2022

Filmography

Films

Television

References

External links 

American male film actors
American male television actors
American male child actors
African-American male actors
Male actors from New Jersey
Actors from Camden, New Jersey
Living people
21st-century African-American people